Leman Aksoy Bozacıoğlu (born Leman Bozacıoğlu) is a Turkish female association football referee. She is a school teacher from profession.

Private life
Bozacıoğlu moved in 2014 to Antalya from Istanbul. She lives in Gazipaşa district of Antalya, where she serves as a teacher of physical education.

She is married to a military officer. The couple is parent of a child.

Sports career

Football referee
Bozacıoğlu decided to pırsue a referee career following an advise of her trainer as she played football in the school team in 2006.

began her referee career in a men's Regional Amateur League match as the assistant referee in 2013. The same year, she was appointed  to officiate a Youth League, and a Women's Second League match in the referee position. After serving in the referee role in A2 League and Regional Amateur League matches, she debuted in the Women's First on November 15, 2015.

During her referee career, she served two seasons in Istanbul, two in Antalya, ıne in Niğde, two in Şırnak and then in Northern Cyprus before she settled in Antalya.

In 2014, she was named "Best Referee of the Year" in the women's football category by a local media.

In 2016, Bozacıoğlu served as the fourth official in a friendly test match between the German teams SV Wehen Wiesbaden and Hannover 96 in Belek, Antalya.

Athletics trainer
Bozacıoğlu is a 3rd-class certified trainer for athletics.

References

Turkish football referees
Living people
Turkish sportswomen
Year of birth missing (living people)
Women association football referees